Geosesarma is genus of small freshwater or terrestrial crabs, typically less than  across the carapace. They live and reproduce on land with the larval stages inside the egg. They are found from India, through Southeast Asia, to the Solomon Islands and Hawaii.

In the pet trade, they are sometimes called vampire crabs. This has nothing to do with their feeding habits, but rather with the bright, contrastingly yellow eyes of some Geosesarma species.

Species
Geosesarma contains these species:

Geosesarma aedituens Naruse & Jaafar, 2009
Geosesarma albomita Yeo & Ng, 1999
Geosesarma amphinome (De Man, 1899)
Geosesarma angustifrons (A. Milne-Edwards, 1869)
Geosesarma araneum (Nobili, 1899)
Geosesarma aurantium Ng, 1995
Geosesarma bau Ng & Jongkar, 2004
Geosesarma bicolor Ng & Davie, 1995
Geosesarma bintan T. M. Leong, 2014
Geosesarma cataracta Ng, 1986
Geosesarma celebense (Schenkel, 1902)
Geosesarma clavicrure (Schenkel, 1902)
Geosesarma confertum (Ortmann, 1894)
Geosesarma danumense Ng, 2003
Geosesarma dennerle Ng, Schubart & Lukhaup, 2015
Geosesarma foxi (Kemp, 1918)
Geosesarma gordonae (Serène, 1968)
Geosesarma gracillimum (De Man, 1902)
Geosesarma hagen Ng, Schubart & Lukhaup, 2015
Geosesarma hednon Ng, Liu & Schubart, 2003
Geosesarma ianthina Pretzmann, 1985
Geosesarma insulare Ng, 1986
Geosesarma johnsoni (Serène, 1968)
Geosesarma katibas Ng, 1995
Geosesarma krathing Ng & Naiyanetr, 1992
Geosesarma larsi Ng & Grinang, 2018
Geosesarma lawrencei Manuel-Santos & Yeo, 2007
Geosesarma leprosum (Schenkel, 1902)
Geosesarma maculatum (De Man, 1892)
Geosesarma malayanum Ng & Lim, 1986
Geosesarma nannophyes (De Man, 1885)
Geosesarma nemesis Ng, 1986
Geosesarma noduliferum (De Man, 1892)
Geosesarma notophorum Ng & C. G. S. Tan, 1995
Geosesarma ocypodum (Nobili, 1899)
Geosesarma penangense (Tweedie, 1940)
Geosesarma peraccae (Nobili, 1903)
Geosesarma protos Ng & Takeda, 1992
Geosesarma rathbunae (Serène, 1968)
Geosesarma rouxi (Serène, 1968)
Geosesarma sabanum Ng, 1992
Geosesarma sarawakense (Serène, 1968)
Geosesarma scandens Ng, 1986
Geosesarma serenei Ng, 1986
Geosesarma solomonense (Serène, 1968)
Geosesarma starmuhlneri Pretzmann, 1984
Geosesarma sumatraense Ng, 1986
Geosesarma sylvicola (De Man, 1892)
Geosesarma ternatense (Serène, 1968)
Geosesarma teschi Ng, 1986
Geosesarma thelxinoe (De Man, 1908)
Geosesarma tiomanicum Ng, 1986
Geosesarma vicentense (Rathbun, 1914)

As of March 2015, professor Peter Ng of National University of Singapore has named 20 Geosesarma species, and he "has another half a dozen or so newly collected Geosesarma species from Southeast Asia in his lab, and these species still need to be named and described."

Threats
Geosesarma dennerle and Geosesarma hagen, both originally from Java, are threatened by  illegal overcollection for the aquarium trade.

References

External links

Grapsoidea
Terrestrial crustaceans
Taxa named by Johannes Govertus de Man